Beech Grove is an unincorporated community in Grainger County, Tennessee, in the United States.

History
The community was named from the presence of beech trees near the town site.

References

Unincorporated communities in Grainger County, Tennessee
Unincorporated communities in Tennessee